Pieter Holsteyn (1614, Haarlem – 1673, Haarlem), was a Dutch Golden Age watercolor painter and engraver.

Biography
According to Houbraken who called him "Holstein", his father Pieter Holsteyn I was a good glass painter and his brother Cornelis was a good painter. Houbraken quoted Samuel Ampzing who mentioned Holstein together with Johannes Boeckhorst as good glasspainters who painted the scenes of the damiaatjes story in the magistrate's room in the Haarlem City Hall. In his biographical sketch of Rochus van Veen Houbraken mentioned the auction of watercolor paintings in Haarlem in 1706 of insects and birds that were painted in the style of Pieter Holsteyn.

According to the RKD he was the son of Pieter I and the brother of Cornelis. He worked in Haarlem, Amsterdam, Munster and Enkhuizen and was the teacher of the painter Josua Breckerveld. He signed his works with the monogram "PH". The painter Herman Henstenburgh was influenced by his watercolors.

References

External links
Pieter Holsteyn on Artnet

1614 births
1673 deaths
Dutch Golden Age painters
Dutch male painters
Artists from Haarlem